Kofi Dill (born 19 October 1979) is a retired Bermudian football player.

Club career
Dill began his career with North Village Rams, and played for the team for six years in the Bermudian Premier Division prior to joining the Bermuda Hogges in the USL Second Division in 2008. After retiring, he continued to play for Rams' Corona League team.

International career
He made his debut for Bermuda in a January 1999 friendly match against Antigua and Barbuda and earned a total of 15 caps, scoring no goals. He has represented his country in 3 FIFA World Cup qualification matches. He played in one of Bermuda's qualifying games for the 2006 FIFA World Cup, and in two of Bermuda's qualifying games for the 2010 FIFA World Cup, including their historic 2–1 victory over Trinidad and Tobago on June 15, 2008. That match also proved to be his final international game.

References

External links

1979 births
Living people
Place of birth missing (living people)
Association football central defenders
Bermudian footballers
Bermuda international footballers
North Village Rams players
Bermuda Hogges F.C. players
USL Second Division players